Doodia is a genus of ferns in the family Blechnaceae, subfamily Blechnoideae, in the suborder Aspleniineae (eupolypods II). It is named after Samuel Doody (1656-1706), an English botanist. Distribution of the genus includes parts of Australia and New Zealand.

Phylogenic studies found Doodia to be embedded within the paraphyletic Blechnum as then circumscribed. In 2011, Christenhusz et al. therefore reassigned Doodia species to Blechnum. The alternative taken in the Pteridophyte Phylogeny Group classification of 2016 (PPG I) is to split Blechnum into a number of smaller genera, including Doodia.

Species
, the Checklist of Ferns and Lycophytes of the World accepted the following species:

References

 C. Michael Hogan. 2009. Crown Fern: Blechnum discolor, Globaltwitcher.com, ed. N. Stromberg
 New Zealand journal of botany. 2006. vol. 18

Blechnaceae
Fern genera